My River Flows is an album by the progressive rock group IZZ, released in 2005. It is their third completely studio album and fourth overall. It is the first IZZ album to feature an epic track with subsections.

Track listing
"My River Flows" – 5:28
"Late Night Salvation"  – 12:16
"Rose Colored Lenses"  – 3:40
"Deception"  – 7:17
"Crossfire"  – 8:33
"Anything I Can Dream"  – 3:22
"Abby's Song"  – 3:48
"Deafening Silence"  – 21:36
i "Realization"
ii "Lesson from the Heart"
iii "Deafening Silence"
iv "Passage of Life"
v "Sanctuary"
vi "Illumination"

Personnel
Tom Galgano - keyboards, vocals
John Galgano - bass, guitar, vocals, keyboards
Paul Bremner - guitars
Greg DiMiceli - acoustic drums, percussion
Brian Coralian - acoustic and electronic drums, percussion
Anmarie Byrnes - vocals
Laura Meade - vocals

2005 albums
IZZ albums